is a Japanese footballer who plays for Oita Trinita (on loan) from Cerezo Osaka.

Club statistics
Updated to 25 February 2019.

References

External links
Profile at Zweigen Kanazawa

Profile at Cerezo Osaka

1997 births
Living people
Association football people from Gunma Prefecture
Japanese footballers
Japan youth international footballers
J1 League players
J2 League players
J3 League players
Cerezo Osaka players
Cerezo Osaka U-23 players
Zweigen Kanazawa players
Oita Trinita players
Association football defenders